The 2009 Texas Longhorns football team (variously "Texas" or "UT" or the "Horns") represented the University of Texas at Austin in the 2009 NCAA Division I FBS football season. The team was coached by Mack Brown. Texas played their home games in Darrell K Royal–Texas Memorial Stadium.

The Longhorns finished the season 13–1, and 8–0 in Big 12 play. They represented the Big 12 South Division in the Big 12 Championship Game where they defeated Nebraska 13–12 to become Big 12 Champions. The team finished the regular season ranked #2 in the Bowl Championship Series to earn a berth in the BCS National Championship Game where they were defeated by Alabama 37–21. Texas finished the season ranked #2 in the AP and coaches poll.

Before the season

Previous seasons
The Longhorns have enjoyed considerable success in recent seasons.  In 2008, their only loss was by 6 points to Texas Tech who scored with 1 second left to win the game on Halloween night.  They beat the OU Sooners by the same 10 point spread as the 2008 National Champions, the University of Florida.  The 2004 team had the first Bowl Championship Series win for any Texas team  and the 2005 team won the National Championship (the fourth for the UT football program).  The 2006 team finished with 10 wins, 3 losses, including a victory in the 2006 Alamo Bowl. In 2007, the Longhorns finished with a victory in the 2007 Holiday Bowl, a 10–3 record for the season, and a tenth-place ranking in the final AP poll and the USA Today coaches poll.

Quarterback Colt McCoy returned to play his senior season at Texas.  He was also the starting quarterback for the Longhorns in 2006 and 2007.

Schedule
On February 25, 2008, UT and A&M announced that their annual game would move onto Thanksgiving Day for 2008 and 2009.  The game was televised by ESPN.  The same day, Texas announced that Arkansas dropped Texas from the 2009 schedule.

Denotes the largest crowd to watch a football game in the state of Texas, at a Big 12 Conference Stadium, or in the Southwest region (beating record set at DKR during the 2008 Texas Longhorns season).
Denotes the largest crowd to watch a football game at DKR  set earlier in 2009. The largest crowd to watch a game in the state of Texas and Southwest region records were broken on September 20 when the Dallas Cowboys played in front of 105,121 at Cowboys Stadium.

Game summaries

Louisiana–Monroe

In the season opener, Texas routed ULM 59–20 as quarterback Colt McCoy passed for over 300 yards and two touchdowns and his roommate, number 1 receiver Jordan Shipley, had 180 yards receiving.

Wyoming

In the first half, Texas got off to a slow start, with Wyoming leading 10-6 at one point, but rallied to blow out Wyoming in the second half, with QB Colt McCoy passing for 300 yards and three touchdowns.

Texas Tech

The series with the Texas Tech Red Raiders began in 1928, and entering the game, the Longhorns' record was 43–15–0.

Texas was in for revenge after the previous season's last-second Michael Crabtree miracle breakaway for a touchdown in a 39–33 loss to Tech which eliminated Texas from the championship race. Texas scored the first touchdown on a Jordan Shipley punt return that got the mascot in his feet to give Texas a 7–3 lead, which thereafter they did not let up and got their revenge in a 34–24 victory over Texas Tech.

UTEP

The 2008 game was the first meeting between the Longhorns and the UTEP Miners. Texas won 42–13. The 2009 game was the first occasion for the Miners to visit Austin. Texas led 47–7 at halftime and routed the Miners.

Colorado

Texas struggled early against Colorado, trailing 14–3 at one point. However a series of non-offensive touchdowns led the Longhorns to a 38–14 victory. The sloppiness of this game however caused the Longhorns to drop from number 2 to number 3 in the AP Poll.

Oklahoma

The rivalry with Oklahoma has been called one of the greatest sports rivalries.  Since 1929 the game has been held at the Cotton Bowl in Dallas, typically in mid-October with the State Fair of Texas occurring adjacent to the stadium.

Texas started off slowly, trailing 6–0. OU QB Sam Bradford was injured and out for the season due to a result of a hit by CB Aaron Williams early in the game.  The game was a defensive struggle, but a leaping interception by Aaron Williams of Landry Jones in the red zone put Texas in position to put the game away. However, Colt McCoy threw an interception a few plays later, but made a touchdown-saving tackle on the return. A few plays later, safety Earl Thomas intercepted Landry Jones to seal the game for the Longhorns.

Missouri

Texas jumped out to a 21–0 lead on Missouri in a sold-out stadium. The Horns dominated the game, winning 41–7 with three touchdowns from Colt McCoy.

Oklahoma State

In what was supposed to be a match-up between the Big 12's two best teams on Halloween night in Stillwater, Oklahoma, Texas dominated. The Horns intercepted OSU QB Zac Robinson 4 times, returning two for TDs.

UCF

The Longhorns came out flat against the Knights but Colt McCoy passed for 470 yards and Jordan Shipley set the school receiving record with 273 yards, as the running game amassed less than 50 yards on the ground.

Baylor

The Longhorns first played the Baylor Bears in 1901 and faced them annually during the days of the Southwest Conference.  In the 98 meetings through 2008, Texas' record with the Bears was 72 wins, 22 losses, and 4 ties.  This is Texas' third-longest rivalry by number of games: only Oklahoma and Texas A&M have faced Texas more often on the football field.

On Baylor's first drive, they moved the ball into the red zone, but CB Aaron Williams intercepted a pass in the endzone and the game would be dominated by the Horns from there. Texas jumped out to a 40-0 halftime lead, and lead 47-0 at one point. Baylor was able to score two late td's however.

Kansas

In Colt McCoy's last home game, the Horns routed the reeling Kansas Jayhawks, riding a five-game losing streak. Colt McCoy passed for 396 yards and 4 TDs, and in victory became the winningest QB in college football history.

Texas A&M

This game marked the 116th meeting between Texas and the Texas A&M Aggies and it was the fifth year as part of a multi-sport rivalry called the Lone Star Showdown.  The football rivalry began in 1894 and it is the longest-running rivalry for both the Longhorns and the Aggies and it is also the third most-played rivalry in Division I-A college football. Texas entered the 2009 contest with a 74–36–5 record against Texas A&M.  Since the series began in 1900, the game has traditionally been played on Thanksgiving Day or Thanksgiving weekend.

Big 12 Championship Game – Nebraska

BCS National Championship – Alabama

On game day, Texas wore its white jerseys and was situated on the east sideline, and Alabama wore its crimson jerseys and used the west bench at the Rose Bowl stadium.

Alabama made their first appearance in the BCS National Championship Game. The last time Texas played at the Rose Bowl, Texas won the BCS National Championship in the 2006 Rose Bowl by defeating USC 41–38 with Vince Young scoring an 8-yard run touchdown with 19 seconds left in the game. The previous year, Texas won the Rose Bowl game 38–37 over Michigan when Dusty Mangum kicked a field goal as time expired.

This game did not result in a victory like all the others had that season. Texas QB Colt McCoy went down early and was replaced by true freshman Garrett Gilbert, who threw four interceptions.

Texas has played in the Rose Bowl once during the regular season, losing to UCLA 49–31 during the 1998 season.

Rankings

Statistics

Team

Scores by quarter

Offense

Rushing

Provided by CFB at Sports Reference: View Original Table Generated 11/17/2022.

Passing

Provided by CFB at Sports Reference: View Original Table Generated 11/17/2022

Receiving

Provided by CFB at Sports Reference: View Original Table Generated 11/17/2022.

Defense

Provided by CFB at Sports Reference: View Original Table Generated 11/17/2022.

Special teams

Provided by CFB at Sports Reference: View Original Table Generated 11/17/2022.

Provided by CFB at Sports Reference: View Original Table Generated 11/17/2022.

References

Texas
Texas Longhorns football seasons
Big 12 Conference football champion seasons
Texas Longhorns football